Michael Bell (born August 11, 1982),  is an American professional basketball player for Metropoli Basketball Academy in Cartago, Costa Rica.

High school career
Bell played high school basketball at Enloe High School in Raleigh, North Carolina.

College career
After high school, Bell played college basketball for the NC State Wolfpack, and Florida Atlantic University, with the Florida Atlantic Owls from 2000 to 2005. He was Atlantic Sun Player of the Year in 2005.

College statistics

|-
| style="text-align:left;"| 2000-01
| style="text-align:left;"| NC State
| 4 ||0  ||  || .667 || .000 || .333|| 1.25 ||1.30  || 0 || 0 || 1.80
|-
| style="text-align:left;"| 2001-02
| style="text-align:left;"| NC State
| 14 ||0  ||  || .300 || .200 || .545|| 1.07 ||1.30  || 0.43 || 0.21 || 0.90
|-
| style="text-align:left;"| 2003-04
| style="text-align:left;"| Florida Atlantic
| 27 ||27  ||36.4  || .464 || .312 || .539|| 10.33 ||1.30  || 1.15 || 1.96 || 17.96
|-
| style="text-align:left;"| 2004-05
| style="text-align:left;"| Florida Atlantic
| 27 ||26  ||35.1  || .485 || .329 || .508|| 9.52 ||1.11  || 1.04 || 1.89 || 19.11
|-

Career statistics

Regular season 

|-
| align="left" |2005-06
| align="left" | Tuborg
| 8 ||  || 20.6 || .394 || .267 || .167 || 5.4 ||0.8 || 0.4 || 1.3 ||  3.6
|-
| align="left" |2007-08
| align="left" | Brest
| 9 ||  || 24.3 || .365 || .138 || .748 || 7.1 ||1.2 || 1.1 || 1.0 ||  10.2
|-
| align="left" |2009-10
| align="left" | Oita
| 50 ||50  || 34.8 || .493 || .292 || .507 || 12.4 ||2.2 || 1.2 || 1.2 ||  21.3
|-
| align="left" |2010-11
| align="left" | Sendai
| 36 ||36  || 34.0 || .515 || .374 || .452 || 9.8 ||2.4 || 0.8 || 1.3 ||  18.4
|-
| align="left" |2010-11
| align="left" | Toros
| 4 ||  3|| 26.7 || .405 || .235 || .667 || 6.75 ||0.75 || 0.75 || 0.50 ||  11.0
|-
| align="left" |2011-12
| align="left" | Osaka
| 30 ||  27|| 32.2 || .453 || .290 || .470 || 10.0 ||2.2 || 1.2 || 1.2 ||  14.5
|-
| align="left" |2012-13
| align="left" | Osaka
| 44 ||  43|| 32.0 || .449 || .222 || .568 || 11.6 ||2.0 || 1.4 || 1.2 ||  14.4
|-
| align="left" |2015-16
| align="left" | Shinshu
| 52 ||  46|| 32.9 || .456 || .339 || .595 || 11.9 ||2.6 || 1.3 || 1.7 ||  17.5
|-
| align="left" |2018
| align="left" | Hanoi
| 20 || || 39.4 || .581 || .354 || .463 ||bgcolor="CFECEC"| 17.7* ||2.8 || 1.8 || bgcolor="CFECEC"|3.1* ||  20.4
|-
| align="left" |2019
| align="left" | Hanoi
| 10 || || 37.5 || .557 || .365 || .611 || bgcolor="CFECEC"|21.5* ||2.8 || 2.0 || bgcolor="CFECEC"|3.0* ||  24.6
|-
| align="left" |2019-20
| align="left" | Yamagata
| 2 ||  2|| 38.5 || .395 || .143 || .500 || 18.0 ||4.5 || 2.5 || 0 ||  16.0
|-

NBA Summer League 

|-
| align="left" |2007-08
| align="left" | Orlando
| 2 || 0 || 3.0 || .500 || .000 || .000 || 0 ||0 || 0 || 0 ||  1.0
|-

Awards
bj League monthly MVP (2010)
VBA weekly MVP(2018)
2x VBA weekly MVP(2019)

References

External links

1982 births
Living people
Akita Northern Happinets players
American expatriate basketball people in China
American expatriate basketball people in France
American expatriate basketball people in Hong Kong
American expatriate basketball people in Japan
American expatriate basketball people in Mexico
American expatriate basketball people in New Zealand
American expatriate basketball people in Spain
American expatriate basketball people in Turkey
American expatriate basketball people in Vietnam
American men's basketball players
Basketball players from Nevada
Basketball players from Raleigh, North Carolina
Centers (basketball)
Ehime Orange Vikings players
Florida Atlantic Owls men's basketball players
NC State Wolfpack men's basketball players
Osaka Evessa players
Passlab Yamagata Wyverns players
Power forwards (basketball)
Sendai 89ers players
William G. Enloe High School alumni